
Gmina Buk is an urban-rural gmina (administrative district) in Poznań County, Greater Poland Voivodeship, in west-central Poland.

Villages
Apart from the town of Buk, Gmina Buk contains the villages and settlements of Cieśle, Dakowy Suche, Dobieżyn, Dobra, Kalwy, Niepruszewo, Otusz, Pawłówko, Szewce, Szewce-Zgoda, Sznyfin, Wielka Wieś, Wiktorowo, Wygoda, Wysoczka and Żegowo.

Neighbouring gminas
Gmina Buk is bordered by the gminas of Dopiewo, Duszniki, Granowo, Opalenica, Stęszew and Tarnowo Podgórne.

References
Polish official population figures 2006

Buk
Poznań County